Hedgehog coronavirus 1 is a mammalian Group C Betacoronavirus, a positive-sense RNA virus, discovered in European hedgehogs (Erinaceus europaeus) from Germany and first described in 2014.

Most Betacoronavirus clade c viruses are known from bats. The hedgehog is in the animal order Eulipotyphla, which is phylogenetically related to the bats, Chiroptera, so the researchers investigated faecal samples to look for coronaviruses.

The virus was found in the highest concentrations in the lower gastrointestinal tract.

See also
Animal viruses
MERS-CoV

References

Merbecovirus
Animal viral diseases
Hedgehog diseases